Masterblaster is a 1987 action thriller film directed by Glenn R. Wilder. The film stars Jeff Moldovan and Donna Rosea.

Cast
 Jeff Moldovan as Jeremy Hawk
 Donna Rosea  as Samantha Rosen
 Joe Hess as De Angelo
 Robert Goodman as Mike
 Richard St. George as Monk
 Jorge Gil as Snake
 Pete Lundblad as Lewis
 Earleen Carey as Laura
 R.J. Reynolds as Jimmy Roy
 Julian Byrd as Gary Lee
 Ron Burgs as Bobby Jo
 Tracy Hutchinson as Lisa
 Bill Wohrman as Brad
 Raymond Forchion as Lincoln Shakir
 Yoshimitsu Yamada as Yamada
 Antoni Corone as Leon
 Big Mike Tiederberg as Gunther
 Lou Ann Carroll as Vicki
 Kari Whitman as Jennifer
 Tom Law as Ish
 Tony Pitt as Tony
 D.L. Blakely as JoJo

References

External links

1987 films
1987 action thriller films
American action thriller films
1980s American films